RX J1242.6−1119A (often abbreviated RX J1242−11) is an elliptical galaxy located approximately 200 megaparsecs (about 650 million light-years) from Earth. According to current interpretations of X-ray observations made by the Chandra X-ray Observatory and XMM-Newton, the center of this galaxy is a 100 million solar mass supermassive black hole which was observed to have tidally disrupted a star (in 1992 or shortly before). The discovery is widely considered to be the first strong evidence of a supermassive black hole ripping apart a star and consuming a portion of it.

Location in the sky
The location of RX J1242.6-1119A, as seen from Earth, is less than one degree to the northeast of Messier 104, the Sombrero Galaxy.

References

External links
 Komossa's Object
 Chandra X-Ray Observatory Photo Album – February 18, 2004
 41QuarkBuchiNeri.pdf

Elliptical galaxies
Virgo (constellation)
ROSAT objects